Denileukin diftitox (trade name Ontak) was an antineoplastic agent, an engineered protein combining interleukin-2 and diphtheria toxin.  Denileukin diftitox could bind to interleukin-2 receptors and introduce the diphtheria toxin into cells that express those receptors, killing the cells.  In some leukemias and lymphomas, malignant cells express these receptors, so denileukin diftitox can target these. 

In 1999, Ontak was approved by the U.S. Food and Drug Administration (FDA) for treatment of Cutaneous T-cell lymphoma (CTCL). 

There is some evidence tying it to vision loss, and in 2006 the FDA added a black box warning to the drug's label.

In 2014, marketing of Ontak was discontinued in the US.

References

External links 
 FDA Safety Alert

Antineoplastic drugs
Diphtheria